This is a list of characters of the manga series Demon Slayer: Kimetsu no Yaiba.

Main characters

Tanjiro Kamado

 
 is the oldest son of charcoal sellers Tanjuro and Kie Kamado. His life changed when his entire family was massacred by the demon Muzan Kibutsuji while he was out selling charcoal. At the same time, his sister, Nezuko, survived but had been turned into a demon. This event becomes his drive and motivation to find a cure for her and turn her back into a human. To this end, he decided to join the Demon Slayer Corps. He initially trained under Sakonji Urokodaki, learning the  sword style. Later, Tanjiro began using his family's  technique based on the original breath style, . Tanjiro would then merge both methods to create a more sustainable fighting style. His skull is exceptionally thick, and his headbutts are used as gags throughout the series. He is characterized as a pure and kind-hearted individual, always looking after the well-being of his comrades and sympathizing with the plight of demons. Nonetheless, he possesses an understanding that their actions cannot be forgiven. His endless optimism and simple nature enable most people to enjoy his company. Still, at the same time, it also puts him at odds with certain personalities. Tanjiro has a heightened sense of smell which allows him to track down demons and evade their attacks, as well as determine people's real emotions. Tanjiro's sword is colored black, occasionally turning crimson red. His sword technique becomes enhanced when combined with Nezuko's "Blood Demon Art: Exploding Blood", a method he later learns to perform without her help. Though he eventually avenges his family during the final battle, he loses his left arm and right eye in the process while being fatally wounded. Both are restored during Muzan's attempt to turn him into his successor by transforming him into a demon, though with the aid of his friends, he becomes human once again.

Nezuko Kamado

 is the oldest daughter of a charcoal-selling family and Tanjiro's younger sister. She was turned into a demon during her family's massacre. Her character functions as motivation and support for Tanjiro. Despite Muzan's assumption that he killed them all in his attempt to sire a sunlight-resistant demon, Nezuko survives as a demon with her mind mostly gone. However, she retains enough of her memories to keep herself from killing Tanjiro. Due to two years of hypnotic conditioning by Urokodaki, Nezuko regards all humans as her family and will mercilessly attack any demon that threatens them. Instead of consuming human flesh, Nezuko regains energy from sleep and tends to become unconscious for long periods of time after overexerting herself. Initially, she is unable to speak and must wear a bamboo muzzle, given to her by Giyu Tomioka, to keep from biting anyone. However in later volumes, the muzzle is removed and she gains the power of speech, albeit broken due to not speaking for more than two years. Nezuko has the standard powers of demons, including regeneration, superhuman strength, growing and shrinking rapidly, and a Blood Demon Art called  that causes her blood to burn once it leaves her body. Tanjiro generally carries her around in a wooden box (a gift from Urokodaki) until she develops the ability to survive exposure to sunlight, with Muzan targeting her soon after. Nezuko's mind and humanity are eventually restored during the final battle against Muzan Kibutsuji.

Zenitsu Agatsuma

An extremely cowardly boy who was forced to join the Demon Slayer Corps at around the same time as Tanjiro to pay for his debts,  sometimes functions as comic relief. His cowardly personality is also used to contrast with Tanjiro's determined character. Zenitsu trained in the  style by the former Thunder Hashira but was only able to learn the first form, and because of this he often belittles himself, despite the fact that he is talented. He joins up with Tanjiro on a mission and since then, he has tagged along with him, partially out of his infatuation with Nezuko, but also due to recognizing how honest and kind he is. His cowardly personality initially hinders him and he is only able to fight when he is unconscious or asleep, but he later learns to push his fears aside and take action when needed, to the point of developing a new, exclusive Thunder Breathing form. Zenitsu's sword is colored yellow and has a lightning bolt design. He has a heightened sense of hearing which allows him to distinguish a person's true character by the sound of their heartbeat and track demons.

Inosuke Hashibira

A young boy who was raised by his mother Kotoha Hashibira for a short time until she was murdered by a demon, later revealed as Upper Rank Two, Doma of the Twelve Kizuki. After she sacrificed herself to save his life, he was raised by wild boars, and then taught to read and write by an old man.  uses a self-taught style called , along with two serrated swords in battle. When he gets new swords, he purposely chips them in order to match his preference and fighting style (much to his swordsmith's anger). Like Zenitsu, Inosuke is occasional comic relief for the series. He is portrayed as brash and prone to reacting violently, and while he appears dim, he proves himself in battle time after time. He is drawn as extremely muscular and rugged, which contrasts with his oddly effeminate face, which he normally hides under a boar's head mask. This mask was made from the head of his deceased boar mother, and he wears it in memory of her. When Inosuke first meets Tanjiro, he treats him as an enemy, but they quickly become friends as they fight together. He often challenges Tanjiro to competitions that are accepted in good spirits. He took the Demon Slayer Corps test at the same time as Tanjiro and Zenitsu and, unknown to most, became the first to clear it. Inosuke's swords are colored blue-grey. He has a heightened sense of touch, being able to locate enemies by feeling the vibrations in the air.

Kanao Tsuyuri

 joins the Demon Slayer Corps at the same time as Tanjiro, Zenitsu, and Genya. She is the protegé of Shinobu Kochō, the current Insect Hashira, and is being trained as a Tsuguko, or successor to the Hashira - however, it does not necessarily mean that she is an Insect Hashira nor has the same "breathing technique" as Shinobu. She uses the  style and is a highly-skilled fighter, but has difficulty functioning without being directly told what to do. She grew up in a poor, abusive household and was sold as a slave, leading her to shut off her emotions as a way to cope. Even after being rescued and taken in by Shinobu and Kanae, she would never do anything unless ordered, so Kanae gave her a coin to flip which she could use whenever she had trouble making decisions. She relies heavily on her coin flipping to make decisions until Tanjiro becomes friendly with her, which convinces her to use the coin less often and stick to her own intuition. It is also implied that she may have feelings for Tanjiro, to the point of risking her life to help save him when he was turned into a demon. Kanao's sword is colored pink and her heightened sense of sight allows her to easily dodge enemy attacks, but she strains herself by overusing this ability during her fight with Doma, to the point of becoming blind in one eye. She is later revealed to have married Tanjiro, having two great-great-grandsons named Kanata Kamado and Sumihiko Kamado between them.

Genya Shinazugawa

Another Demon Slayer who joins at the same time as Tanjiro Kamado and Zenitsu Agatsuma.  is portrayed as a harsh and foul-mouthed individual obsessed with nothing beyond demon killing. His personality later changes after he fights beside Tanjiro to save the hidden Swordsmith Village. Unlike most other Demon Slayers, he is unable to use breathing techniques or traditional sword fighting styles. Instead, he eats parts of the demons he fights, and through his special digestive system, he temporarily gains demonic powers. His powers can be lesser or greater, depending on the strength of the demon he devours. When he utilize a demon's powers, he is also susceptible to a demon's weaknesses. Genya also carries a shotgun that shoots specialized bullets that are made of the same material as the Demon Slayers' Nichirin blades as well as a Nichirin wakizashi. He is the younger brother of Sanemi Shinazugawa, the current Wind Hashira, who always avoids him, unaware that his older brother wants him to have a normal life. Genya is mortally wounded while assisting the Hashira against Kokushibo, reconciling with his brother before passing away. In the Reiwa Era, he and his brother are reincarnated as police officers.

Demon Slayer Corps
The  is an organization that has existed since ancient times, dedicated to protect humankind from demons. There are hundreds of Demon Slayers within the organization, but they act in secrecy even from the Japanese government. The most powerful swordsmen among the Demon Slayers are the  who serve as its elite warriors.

Ubuyashiki Family

The 97th leader of the Demon Slayer Corps whose family established the organization. He is a distant relative of Muzan and his entire bloodline was cursed with a disease that slowly kills them before reaching their thirties, possibly because of their connection with Muzan's blood. He sacrificed himself to weaken Muzan with a massive explosion which destroys his family estate.

The wife and caretaker of Kagaya. She died in the explosion of the Ubuyashiki estate.

The first of the children with her twin sister Nichika, and eldest daughter of Kagaya and Amane. She died in the explosion of the Ubuyashiki estate.

One of the Ubuyashiki children and second eldest daughter of Kagaya and Amane. She died in the explosion of the Ubuyashiki estate.

Kagaya's only son and third of the Ubuyashiki children, who appears during Tanjiro's Demon Slayer Exam. He is almost identical to his younger sisters Kanata and Kuina with the exception of his black hair to their white hair. After the death of his father, Kiriya quickly steps in as Kagaya's successor, commanding the Slayer Corps in the final battle against Muzan and his forces. After Muzan's death, Kiriya officially disbands the Demon Slayer Corps, as their mission to vanquish Muzan and his demons was accomplished. Later it is shown that he became the longest-living person in Japan, still alive after the time skip to the modern times that occurs in the last chapter.

 The fourth of the Ubuyashiki children, and one Kagaya’s youngest daughters, alongside her younger twin sister Kanata. After the death of her father, she assists Kiriya during the final battle.

The youngest of the Ubuyashiki children and the youngest daughter of Kagaya’s children alongside her twin sister Kuina, Kanata is seen accompanying Kiriya. After the death of her father, she assists Kiriya during the final battle.

Hashira

The current Water Hashira. He is the first Demon Slayer that Tanjiro comes across. He initially tries to kill Nezuko but reconsiders after seeing her protect an unconscious Tanjiro. He sends them to his mentor Urokodaki in the hopes that Tanjiro could succeed him and possibly cure Nezuko. Seemingly aloof and unemotional, he does not think of himself as a true Hashira, despite mastering Water Breathing, due to an inferiority complex that stemmed from survivor's guilt during Final Selection. He has developed an additional exclusive form of Water Breathing, which he alone knows. He loses an arm during the final battle against Muzan but survives after the demon is killed. In the Reiwa Era, Giyu's reincarnation is a child named Giichi, who is close friends with Sabito and Makomo's reincarnations.

The current Insect Hashira. She is rather cool-headed and always has a smile on her face, no matter what situation she is put in. She enjoys teasing others, mostly annoying Giyu Tomioka, about how no one likes him. Behind her cheerful facade, she harbors a deep rage towards all demons for taking the lives of her loved ones, including her older sister. Unlike the other Hashira, she does not have the strength to behead them, using instead a small, thin sword to kill demons by inoculating them with a wisteria-based poison she developed. Shinobu sacrifices herself to defeat Doma, having consumed massive doses of wisteria so Doma would be poisoned the moment he devoured her with Kanao and Inosuke finishing him off. Before her death, she also helped Tamayo with developing the cure for Nezuko's demon condition and a mix of poisons used on Muzan to greatly weaken him. In the Reiwa Era, she and Kanae are reincarnated as high school students.
Her Japanese last name  means "butterfly".

The current Flame Hashira after inheriting the title from his father Shinjuro. Though he comes off as boisterous and cheerfully eccentric, Kyojuro is pure-hearted and honorable due to his mother instilling in him a moral code of protecting the weak. He was assigned to investigate the Mugen Train, with Tanjiro, Zenitsu, Inosuke, and Nezuko aiding him to dispatch Enmu. After their battle with Enmu, he meets Akaza of the Twelve Kizuki. Akaza proposes that Kyojuro turn into a demon so they can fight for all of eternity, to which Kyojuro flatly declines. He is ultimately killed by Akaza. After using his last moments to direct Tanjiro to his father, the youth had the tsuba of Kyojuro's broken sword installed into his new sword in respect of the Hashira. In the Reiwa Era, he is reincarnated as a teenage student.

The current Sound Hashira and former shinobi. Exuberant and proud, Tengen always strives to do things "flamboyantly". While he is somewhat arrogant and condescending, Tengen harbors deep regrets over his life as a shinobi, joining the Demon Slayers in the hope to atone for it. He has three wives who served as kunoichi and assist in his mission. He eventually is forced to retire from his position as Hashira after losing a hand and an eye in the battle against Gyutaro. He reappears in the final battle against Muzan, standing guard to protect Kiriya alongside Kyojuro's father. In the Reiwa Era. Tengen has a reincarnation/descendant named Tenma, an athlete who wins a gold medal in gymnastics.

The current Love Hashira and a former disciple of Kyōjurō Rengoku. She has an overtly passionate, somewhat airheaded disposition. Her whip-like sword is made from a malleable metal that only she can properly wield. She possesses enhanced flexibility and abnormal physical strength due to having denser muscles than the average human. She joined the Demon Slayer Corps because she wanted a man that would love her to be stronger than her. She especially admires the other male Hashira and would always praise them in her mind. Thus, when she was mortally wounded during the final battle against Muzan Kibutsuji, she declared her love for Obanai Iguro, before dying alongside him. The epilogue shows her reincarnation in the Reiwa Era married to Obanai's as they run a restaurant together.

The current Mist Hashira. Outwardly nonchalant and indifferent, he possesses a fierce rage against demons that acts as his driving force to fight. He had an older twin brother who was killed by a demon when they were younger. Since then, he has always blamed himself for being the only survivor until Tanjiro manages to cheer him up. Due to the incident, he lost some of his memories, which was restored after realizing Tanjiro had the same red eyes as his father. He is killed in the battle against Upper Rank One, Kokushibo, who is revealed to be his distant ancestor. In the Reiwa era, he is reincarnated as a baby alongside his brother.

The current Stone Hashira and considered the strongest among them. A man of gigantic stature, Gyomei is a former monk who took care of orphaned children. After the children are murdered by a demon and he is framed for the crime, even though he protected them from it, he became more ruthless but still caring. He pities Tanjiro at first due to Nezuko being a demon, but later acknowledges him after seeing how honest he is. He is the only Hashira who does not use a sword, fighting with an enormous flail-like chained axe that only he can wield with ease due to his massive size and strength. He loses a leg in the final battle against Muzan Kibutsuji before dying from blood loss from his wounds. In the Reiwa Era, Gyomei is reincarnated as a kindergarten teacher.

The current Serpent Hashira who is always accompanied by his pet snake, Kaburamaru. A harsh and ruthless young man, he possesses deep self-loathing for his past. He was raised by his family, an all-female clan of bandits, as an offering to a serpentine demon they worshiped, only to be rescued by Shinjuro Rengoku. He joined the Demon Slayer Corps as a means of venting his rage over how his family was destroyed by their association with the demon. He is infatuated with Mitsuri Kanroji and gets easily jealous when she becomes close to someone else. Despite being blinded during the final battle with Muzan Kibutsuji, he still manages to assist Tanjiro due to his connection with Kaburamaru, which allows him to continue fighting. He ends up mortally wounded and declares his love for Mitsuri, before dying alongside her. After his death, Kaburamaru's care is entrusted to Kanao Tsuyuri. The epilogue showed Obanai reincarnated in the Reiwa Era and married to Mitsuri as they run a restaurant together.

The current Wind Hashira. A confrontational and aggressive individual, he attempted to prove Nezuko's demonic nature before the Hashira and Kagaya. Though he fails, he does not accept the Kamado siblings. As a teen, he witnessed the deaths of his siblings and was forced to kill his mother, who was transformed into a demon. He is the older brother of Genya Shinazugawa, his only surviving sibling, and continually shuns him, even though Sanemi actually intends to have his brother quit the Demon Slayer Corps so he can live a normal life. He is one of the two Hashira who survive the final battle against the Upper Ranks and Muzan Kibutsuji, the other being Giyu, though he loses two right fingers during his battle against Upper Rank One, Kokushibo. In the Reiwa Era, he is reincarnated as a police officer.

Butterfly Estate

One of Shinobu's adoptive sisters. Despite having passed the exam to join the Demon Slayers, she became too afraid to fight on the frontlines and since then, instead oversees the rehabilitation of wounded Demon Slayers who are treated at the Butterfly Estate.

A member of the Kakushi, the cleanup brigade of the Demon Slayers.
,  and 

Three little girls who work as servants in the Butterfly Estate. They were taken in by Shinobu after their families were killed by demons.

Swordsmith Village

One of the swordsmiths who makes swords for the Demon Slayer Corps, he was assigned to forge Tanjiro's sword. He has little focus on anything beyond swords and he flies into a murderous rage whenever Tanjiro breaks or loses his sword, only calming down when he is given dango.

Another of the swordsmiths who makes swords for the Demon Slayer Corps, he makes Inosuke's. Despite having a calmer personality than Hotaru, he too flew into a wild rage upon seeing Inosuke use a rock to chip his swords.

A 10 year old who inherits his family's mechanical doll which was made in reference to Yoriichi Tsugikuni. He was injured by a demon made by Gyokko, the Upper Rank Five, but was saved from life-threatening wounds by Tanjiro's handguard, later being protected by Muichiro.

Other members

A member of the Demon Slayer Corps who was sent to Natagumo Mountain. One of the survivors of the operation to slay the Spider Family, he becomes friends with Tanjiro and appears on a few other occasions during the series. Like Tanjiro, Murata also uses Water Breathing but is very weak at it, due to him ''not seeing the water come out of the sword''.

A member of the Demon Slayer Corps who was sent to Natagumo Mountain. She was killed by the Mother Spider Demon.

The former Flower Hashira. Shinobu's late biological older sister and Kanao's late adoptive older sister. She was killed by Doma, Upper Rank Two of the Twelve Kizuki. In the Reiwa Era, she and Shinobu are reincarnated as academy students.

Demons
The  are immortal creatures who feed on human flesh and blood to survive and become stronger with each human they devour. All demons are former humans who lose most of their memories and almost all traces of humanity after drinking or being injected with Muzan Kibutsuji's blood becoming his servants and sharing their own vision and thoughts with him. Higher demons are also capable of casting powerful magic spells called . The specifics of these spells are unique to each Demon.

All demons are weak to sunlight, being easily destroyed upon being exposed to it, but they can also be killed by decapitation with special swords used by the Demon Slayers called . Demons also are highly intolerant to wisteria flowers, avoiding places where such plants are abundant and wisteria extract can be lethal to them in high doses.

Muzan Kibutsuji

The primary antagonist of the series,  was the first and strongest demon in existence. He used his blood to sire the other demons. He was able to manipulate his cellular structure and frequently disguised himself as different humans of various ages and genders. He would program transplanted cells within demons he directly sired to destroy them if they ever mentioned him by name. He could devour the cells of others to assimilate their abilities and memories as well. Muzan was originally a sickly young man from the Heian period whose transition into a demon was the result of an experimental treatment to prolong his life. He killed his doctor before realizing it worked. Muzan has since dedicated himself to "complete his treatment" by siring demons that would help him achieve his goal of overcoming his one weakness, sunlight. He also expressed a justified concern towards those who utilized the Sun Breathing technique since his near-death experience from fighting Yoriichi Tsugikuni. This motivated him to attack Tanjiro's family in an attempt of turning at least one of them into a demon that was naturally immune to sunlight. Nezuko, the only survivor of the incident, eventually manifested that ability and Muzan focused his efforts on capturing and devouring her to remove his only weakness. The Demon Slayer Corps exploited Muzan's obsession and laid a trap for him which killed his remaining followers. Muzan killed Tamayo and many Demon Slayers before realizing that he was infected with a variation of the humanity-restoring serum that Tamayo and Shinobu developed with added poisons that removed most of his abilities and weakened him to be easily killed. This resulted in his body being destroyed by the sunlight when he is held back by the Demon Slayers. Muzan's final act of revenge was to turn Tanjiro into a new demon so he would kill the Demon Slayers. This was thwarted when Tanjiro turned back into a human with his friends' help.

Twelve Kizuki
The  is a special group of demons serving under Muzan, with a special mark of their membership engraved on their eyes. Second only to Muzan, they are the most powerful demons to have lived. The six weakest are known as the Lower Ranks and have a single eye engraved, while the six strongest are called the Upper Ranks and have both eyes engraved. After Rui's death, Muzan decided to eliminate the current Lower Ranks and have only the current Upper Ranks under his command.

Upper Ranks
The high-ranking members of the Twelve Moons. Each of them has lived for a century at least and killed dozens of Hashira. Some of them mutated their bodies to the point that they could not be killed just by decapitation, unlike other demons. Their ranks were unaltered for decades and no Demon Slayer had managed to kill any of them prior to Tanjiro and his friends joining the organization.

Muzan's most powerful subordinate holding the title of Upper Rank One, Kokushibo was originally a Demon Slayer called  and the older twin brother of Yoriichi. Envious of his brother's talent, he ends up tempted to join Muzan's side as a demon in order to eternally perfect himself as a swordsman without the worry of dying of sickness or old age. He dies while fighting a combined effort of Gyomei, Sanemi, Genya, and Muichiro, with the latter two dying from their wounds soon after. 

A nihilistic demon who holds the position of Upper Rank Two. As a child, he was seen by his parents as a perfect, blessed child, thus they started a religious cult around his figure. After his parents' deaths, he assumed control of the cult and after being transformed into a demon by Muzan, he started eating his followers on the notion that those he devoured will live forever inside him. One member of his cult was Inosuke's mother Kotoha, whom he devoured when she ran away from him upon learning his true nature. He also killed Shinobu's older sister Kanae. In a desperate measure to defeat him, Shinobu administers a massive dose of Wisteria in her body and allows herself to be consumed by him. The weakened Doma is later killed by Kanao and Inosuke.

Holding the position of Upper Rank Three, he is a demon who despises whoever he considers weak and offers those he considers strong enough to have his respect the chance to become demons. He was once a human called  who stole as a child to care for his ailing father before he committed suicide to free his burdened son. Hakuji was adopted by a martial artist named Keizo and trained under him while falling in love with his master's daughter Koyuki. Hakuji loses his new family when they were poisoned by a rival dojo who were unable to beat him in a fair fight, leading him to slaughter them all single-handedly before being turned into a demon by Muzan. Akaza fatally wounds and kills Kyojuro and later battles Tanjiro and Giyu. During their battle, he regains his human memories and commits suicide by voluntarily ceasing his regeneration and dying from his wounds.

A seemingly weak demon who holds the position of Upper Rank Four, Hantengu shows his true strength upon dividing himself into multiple clones which denote different emotions. Each has a different appearance, personality, and ability. He was originally a prolific criminal who continuously boasted of his innocence before being turned into a demon by Muzan. He is killed by Tanjiro but lives long enough to inform Muzan about Nezuko's newfound resistance to sunlight, much to his master's joy.

A biwa-playing demon who owns and manipulates  that Muzan made his base of operations. She was once a struggling musician who developed a disturbing habit of murdering prior to a performance as she associated her killings with applause thanks to killing her husband for selling her items. She ended up meeting Muzan when she tried to kill him, only to earn his respect for tracking him and granting her new life as a demon. Nakime is later promoted to Upper Rank Four after Hantengu's death. Nakime confronts Mitsuri and Obanai until she is restrained by Yushiro, prompting Muzan to kill her to prevent his enemies from taking control of the fortress.

A demon with a distorted appearance who always nests himself into a jar, Gyokko holds the position of Upper Rank Five. He claims himself to be an artist and is incredibly proud of his creations, one of which is twisting his victims' bodies and turning them into grotesque, living sculptures. His immense self-pride goes so far as to attempting to break Haganezuka's concentration by attacking him while he was sharpening a sword instead of killing him since he wanted to prove himself as the better artist. He was once an ostracized villager who developed an obsession with corpses after his parents drowned out at sea and their bodies washed up on shore. He kidnaps and kills a child before being stabbed in revenge and left for dead, eventually being transformed by Muzan. He is killed by Muichiro.

A demon disguised as an oiran, Daki shares the position of Upper Rank Six with her brother Gyutaro, both taking advantage of her work in the red-light district to attract their victims. She uses her belt to absorb her victims and places them in a secret location before devouring them. The belt also functions as her main weapon. Her great beauty led to success in the district at a young age. When Ume was 13, she blinded a customer's eye with her hairpin and was bound and immolated in retaliation. She was on the verge of dying along with Gyutaro but was met by Doma, then the holder of Upper Rank Six. The two subsequently became demons. She is killed by Zenitsu and Inosuke. After her death, she returns to her former appearance and meets Gyutaro in the afterlife. He tries to push her away and led her to a brighter future, but Daki refuses to leave him, reminding him of his promise that the two can survive anything together. The siblings enter Hell reunited as one.

A demon with a hideous appearance, Gyutaro shares the position of Upper Rank Six with his sister Daki. He usually hides within Daki and emerged only when her life was threatened. He fights using his poisonous blood and two demonic sickles, as the basis of his Blood Demon Art. He is very protective of his sister and always watches over her from the sidelines. As dual holders of Upper Rank Six, Gyutaro needs to be decapitated together with Daki to be truly defeated. He is killed by Tengen and Tanjiro.

A young demon who attained the position of Upper Rank Six after the deaths of Daki and Gyutaro. Originally one of the orphans under Gyomei Himejima, he was chased out by the other children for stealing temple money and encountered a demon, which he then let into the temple in exchange for having his life spared, leading to their deaths and Gyomei's wrongful imprisonment. He then becomes a member of the Demon Slayer Corps, learning the Thunder Breathing from Jigoro along with Zenitsu, before betraying the Slayer Corps and allowing himself to be transformed into a demon by Kokushibo, which leads Jigoro to commit seppuku in atonement. Unlike Zenitsu, who only mastered the first of the six forms of Thunder Breathing, Kaigaku only mastered the other five. He is killed when Zenitsu strikes him with a seventh, exclusive technique developed by him.

Lower Ranks
The low-ranking members of the Twelve Kizuki, whose membership is constantly shifting compared to the Upper Ranks. Following the death of their members Kyogai and Rui, Muzan kills them all but Enmu for being worthless to his plans.

A sadistic demon holding the position of Lower Rank One, he is intensely devoted to Muzan. His Blood Demon Art allows him to enter and manipulate a person's dream so he can kill them. Being only the Lower Rank that Muzan spared after he slaughtered the others, Enmu is given the task to kill the Hashira and Tanjiro. Enmu lays a trap for Tanjiro and his friends on a train that he later fuses himself to, only to be killed by the Demon Slayers to his shock.

 A youth-like demon holding the position of Lower Rank Five, he was originally a sickly child before Muzan transformed him and he later killed his parents in self-defense when they attempted to kill him before taking their own lives. The ordeal caused Rui to forget his parents while receiving Muzan's permission to transform other humans and demons with his blood into a replacement family that he abuses due to his lack of understanding of familial bonds. This played in his envy for the Kamado siblings' dedication as he loses his calm demeanour and attacks erratically till he was easily killed by Giyu, remembering his parents in his final moments while reuniting with them in death.

He was stripped of his number by Muzan due to slowly losing the ability to eat humans and reaching his limit. Because of this, he obsessively tries to earn his spot back in the Twelve Kizuki, attacking and eating humans who pass by the Tsuzumi Mansion. Prior to becoming a demon, Kyogai was an unsuccessful poet whose works were rejected. He fights using the tsuzumi drums embedded into his body; striking them would him to turn rooms around, change his position throughout the house and create powerful air slashes. Kyogai is slain in a lengthy battle by Tanjiro.

Holding the position of Lower Rank Six, he is killed by Muzan when he decides to purge the Lower Ranks. His death was the result of questioning his master's expectations, which Muzan saw as defiance.

Holding the position of Lower Rank Four, she is killed by Muzan when he decides to purge the Lower Ranks because Muzan deduced she was more afraid of the Demon Slayers than him and interpreted her attempt at saving face as contradicting him.

Holding the position of Lower Rank Three, he is killed by Muzan when he decides to purge the Lower Ranks when he tries to escape.

Holding the position of Lower Rank Two, he is killed by Muzan when he decides to purge the Lower Ranks because he asked Muzan, who does not accept being ordered to do anything, to grant him more power.

A demon holding the position of Lower Rank Two that used to fight with a gun and capable of casting shadowy figures that can destroy everything they touch. He is killed by Kyojuro, who is awarded the title of Flame Hashira for the feat.

A female demon holding the position of Lower Rank One her blood demon art allows her to cast illusion at will. She was later killed by Sanemi Shinezugawa, who is awarded the title of Wind Hashira for the feat.

Spider Family

A member of the Spider Family. Once a young girl who was turned into a demon, she was forced to assume the role of "Mother" by Rui and have her appearance altered. She can control humans using her spider threads, which are attached by small white red and blue spiders. Always living in fear of Rui, she ends up accepting death while fighting Tanjiro and allows herself to be slain by him.

A member of the Spider Family. He assumes the role of "Elder Brother" and is one of the two in the family that only assume a semi-human appearance, the lower half of his body being that of a giant spider's. He can turn humans into monstrous semi-spiders when his minions bite them but is subsequently beheaded by Zenitsu.

A member of the Spider Family. He assumes the role of "Father" and like Older Brother, has a semi-human appearance in that he has a spider head. He possesses monstrous strength. Inosuke has a hard time fighting it before the monster is easily killed by Giyu.

A member of the Spider Family. She assumes the role of "Daughter" and can create acidic prisons of thread that dissolve her enemies and convert them into her food. She is then subdued and killed by Shinobu.

Other Demons

A demon who Tanjiro and Nezuko briefly encounter and defeat together.

A vengeful demon who was captured by Urokodaki and trapped on a mountain used for testing applicants for the Demon Slayer Corps. Unable to escape the mountain, he made it his goal to target and eat all of Urokodaki's disciples as revenge for being trapped including Makomo and Sabito. He succeeded for the most part, only failing to eat Giyu and later, Tanjiro. 

A demon who has been kidnapping young women. He attempts to consume girls before they go beyond 16 years and "become rotten". He is the target of Tanjiro's first assignment as a Demon Slayer and is eventually killed by him.

A demon who directly serves Muzan. While he believes that he is one of the Twelve Kizuki, he is actually not, as he lacks a number on his eye: the mark of a Kizuki. His power is to manipulate the movement and direction of things using the eyeballs on the palms of his hands. He works together with Susamaru and is killed by Tanjiro.

A demon who directly serves Muzan, assuming she is one of the Twelve Kizuki yet lacks a number on her eye. Her power is in sprouting multiple arms and creating special Temari, using them as projectile weapons in conjunction with Yahaba's ability. Susamaru is defeated when Tamayo uses her hypnosis to trick her into triggering Muzan’s curse, causing her body to destroy itself, with whatever remained evaporated by the sun.
Tongue Demon

A demon that lived in the Tsuzumi Mansion. He is slain by Zenitsu.
Horned Demon

A demon that lived in the Tsuzumi Mansion. He is slain by Inosuke.

Kamado family
The members of the Kamado family are descendants of Sumiyoshi, old friend of Yoriichi Tsugikuni who created Sun Breathing, which the ceremonial dance known as Hinokami Kagura is the thirteenth form of Sun Breathing, done from sun up to sun down. The only surviving members are Tanjiro and Nezuko, after their father's death by disease and their other relatives being killed by Muzan Kibutsuji in an attempt to sire more demons.

The late husband of Kie Kamado and father of Tanjiro Kamado and Nezuko Kamado. From him, Tanjiro inherits his earrings and the Hinokami Kagura, which he could perform effortlessly for hours despite his poor health.

Kie was married to Tanjūrō Kamado and had six children, including Tanjiro and Nezuko. After her husband's death, she was left to take care of them all by herself with Tanjiro being the eldest son helping her. She manages to support and keep her family happy until she was killed by Muzan Kibutsuji.

Kamado Takeo is Tanjūrō' Kamado's third child and Tanjiro and Nezuko's younger brother. He seems to be an introverted and unsociable person. He was killed by Muzan Kibutsuji.

Hanako is the fourth child in the Kamado family. She adores Tanjiro and wanted to follow him when he was going away for selling charcoal but she was forbidden by their mother. Tanjiro told her to wait for him until he comes back but she was killed by Muzan Kibutsuji before Tanjiro could return.

Shigeru is the fifth child to Tanjūrō and Kei. Similar to Hanako, he also adores his brother Tanjiro and wanted to follow him. He was killed by Muzan Kibutsuji.

He is the youngest child in the Kamado family who was killed by Muzan Kibutsuji. Nezuko is often reminded of him when she sees other humans.

He is an ancestor of the Kamado family who was friends with Yoriichi Tsugikuni, the creator of Sun Breathing. He is the one who develops the Hinokami Kagura based on a demonstration of Sun Breathing Yoriichi made to him and his family. He also receives from Yoriichi the same Hanafuda earrings which Tanjiro uses.

Tanjiro and Kanao's descendant from the modern days. He is a 15-year-old boy who resembles Tanjiro.

Another of Tanjiro and Kanao's descendants from the modern days, he is Sumihiko's older brother. He is 16 years old and resembles Kanao.

Rengoku family

Former Flame Hashira and father of Kyōjurō and Senjuro. He quits the Demon Slayer Corps upon the realization that his Flame Breathing style is inferior to the original breath style, Sun Breathing. Since then he spends his days drinking at home until he receives Kyōjurō's final message to him, asking his father to take care of himself. He reappears in the final battle against Muzan, standing guard to protect the Ubuyashiki family with Tengen.

Shinjuro's late wife and mother of Kyōjurō and Senjuro.

 Kyōjurō's younger brother. He becomes friends with Tanjiro and begins researching what documents remain from his estate about the Hinokami Kagura and its connection with the Sun Breathing. He later sends a letter to Tanjiro describing a thirteenth, lost technique from the Hinokami Kagura, hoping it would help him in his battle against Muzan.

Tojuro Rengoku 
Senjuro's descendant. He looks similar to and has the same personality as Kyojuro and is close to Sumihiko.

Supporting characters

A former Water Hashira; He is introduced to Tanjiro and Nezuko by his student Giyu. He is initially apprehensive due to Tanjiro's kind nature but agrees to train him. As the training goes on, he grows closer to both Tanjiro and Nezuko, and he sheds tears of joy, when Tanjiro returns from the Demon Slayer exam alive, as he is the first to do so after a long string of deaths. He has since kept a close eye on their growth. He has given his word to the Pillars that if Nezuko were to eat a human, then Tanjiro, as well as Giyu and himself would kill her and themselves in atonement.

One of Urokodaki's disciples. He died during an exam to join the Demon Slayer Corps while trying to save other students who were not as strong as himself, Giyu being one of them. He was especially talented and strong. His spirit advises Tanjiro during his training. Both he and Makomo were killed by the Hand Demon who was captured by Urokodaki.

One of Urokodaki's disciples. She died during an exam to join the Demon Slayer Corps. Like Sabito, she was very talented. She used her speed to her advantage while fighting. Her spirit advises Tanjiro during his training. Both she and Sabito were killed by the Hand Demon who was captured by Urokodaki.

A crow that can speak human language, though it is very loud and limited. Every Demon Slayer has a crow that informs them of their new missions. Zenitsu, however, has a sparrow instead of a crow.

A sparrow who was the only of his species to pass the exam to work as a Kasugai Crow. Assigned to Zenitsu, who nicknames him , he usually reprimands him when he shows cowardice.

A talented doctor who is also a demon. She was converted into a demon by Muzan, which resulted in her killing and eating her family to her horror. Despite that, she was under Muzan's control until the demon was almost killed by Yoriichi Tsugikuni who also spared her. She further altered herself to allow her to survive on a small amount of blood and no flesh. She is attempting to find a cure for demons but requires the blood of special demons. To this end, she enlists help from Tanjiro, who offers some of Nezuko's blood and tries to get blood samples from members of the Twelve Kizuki. She can also create demons—the only other demon besides Muzan who can—but she insists on only doing it for dying patients who have no other option and ensures they know the price of becoming a demon. After completing her research on a cure for Nezuko's condition, Tamayo sacrifices herself to lay an ambush on Muzan with Kagaya's help but despite failing to kill her sworn enemy, she poisons the demon with a mix of substances she developed with Shinobu's help to greatly weaken him.

A demon created by Tamayo. He cares for her greatly and is very protective of her. It has been implied that he loves her. He is the only demon made by Tamayo and as such, has no connection to Muzan. He only needs a small amount of blood to survive, even less than Tamayo. He is mentioned to have a "battle form" that he can change into. He has a special power that can erase the presence of living things as well as make the unseen seen. This technique is not perfect and the more people he attempts to hide, the easier it is to find them. After his master's death, Yushiro assists the Demon Slayers in the final battle against Muzan by providing aid to the wounded soldiers and helping Tanjiro and his friends evade Muzan's attacks with his detecting scrolls. After Muzan's defeat, Yushiro continues living as a demon all the way to modern times, where he makes a living as a painter.

A former Thunder Hashira, he was the instructor for Zenitsu and Kaigaku. Jigoro also took the alias 'Shihan'. He later commits seppuku in atonement for Kaigaku's betrayal.

Inosuke's late mother with a striking resemblance to him. She is killed by Doma, one of the Upper Moons, just after dropping Inosuke from a cliff in a desperate measure to save his life.
   

Three kunoichis and Tengen's wives who assisted helping Tengen and his friends fight against the demons.

Kokushibo's younger twin brother who became a Demon Slayer after his pregnant wife was killed by a demon. He was the one who created Sun Breathing, which branched into other styles. As a Demon Slayer, he alone cornered and almost defeated Muzan, but failed to destroy him completely, despite inflicting multiple wounds on the demon that never healed. He was later expelled from the Demon Slayer Corps once they also learned that he let Tamayo live and his brother became a demon. He later befriends Tanjiro's ancestors and teaches them Sun Breathing, which they pass on to their lineage in the form of the Hinokami Kagura, along with the same hanafuda earrings always used by Tanjiro. He died of old age during a fight with Kokushibo.

Minor characters

A villager who offers Tanjiro to stay at his home during the night his family was attacked by Muzan out of fear for his security.

An udon street vendor. Toyo is very passionate about his udons and can get furious when his bowl is discarded without eating any. He ends up angry at Tanjiro when he flees, leaving his bowl untouched to chase after Muzan, but get pleased when he returns and eats two bowls of udon to make up for it.

A young girl, along with her brother Shoichi, who asks Tanjiro and Zenitsu to help save her brother Kiyoshi from the Tsuzumi Mansion.

A young boy, along with his sister Teruko, who asks Tanjiro and Zenitsu to help save her brother Kiyoshi from the Tsuzumi Mansion. When he is separated from his siblings inside the Mansion, he winds up in Zenitsu's company, quickly becoming aggravated with the Slayer's cowardly demeanor. Due to Zenitsu having killed one of the demons pursuing them in his sleep, he thinks Shoichi is the one who saved his life when they escape the Mansion.

Teruko and Shoichi's elder brother, who gets kidnapped by the Tsuzumi Mansion demon, Kyogai. He is a human of a rare constitution called 'marechi', which according to demons, is far more nutritious than an average person, as it is implied that consuming one marechi is the same as consuming one hundred humans simultaneously. This makes such people extremely valuable to demons.

An elderly woman who welcomes Demon Slayers to rest in her house. Tanjiro and his group visit her after they fight Kyogai.
  
 (Fuku)
 (Tomi)
Anime original characters, they are a grandmother and granddaughter pair who are bento sellers at a train station. They meet Kyojuro during his early investigation of the Mugen Train incident and are saved by him from a demon that emerged from the Mugen Train while it was in repairs. Many years ago, Tomi and her daughter (Fuku's mother) were saved by Kyojuro's father, Shinjuro from a demon, an incident which the former recalled after noticing the similarities between Kyojuro and Shinjuro's fighting style. They are later shown to be the people who sold the bentos which Kyojuro eats on the Mugen Train.

References

External links
  
  at Shonenjump.com 
  at Viz.com

Demon Slayer: Kimetsu no Yaiba
Demon Slayer: Kimetsu no Yaiba